The FIDE Women's Grand Prix 2013–14 was a series of six chess tournaments exclusively for women, which formed part of the qualification cycle for the Women's World Chess Championship 2015. The winner of the Grand Prix was decided in the last stage in Sharjah, UAE, when rating favorite and reigning world champion Hou Yifan overtook second seeded Koneru Humpy to win her third straight Grand Prix cycle. For the third time running, Koneru Humpy finished runner-up to Hou Yifan.

With the overall win Hou Yifan earned the right to play the Women's World Chess Championship 2016 in a ten-game match.

Format
Eighteen women players were to be selected to compete in these tournaments. Each player agrees and will contract to participate in exactly four of these tournaments.  Players must rank their preference of tournaments once the final list of host cities is announced and the dates are allocated to each host city.

Each tournament is a 12-player, single round-robin tournament. In each round players scored 1 point for a win, ½ point for a draw and 0 for a loss. Grand prix points were then allocated according to each player's standing in the tournament: 160 grand prix points for first place, 130 for second place, 110 for third place, and then 90 down to 10 points by steps of 10. In case of a tie in points the grand prix points are shared evenly by the tied players.
Players only counted their best three tournament results. The player with the most grand prix points is the winner.

Players and qualification
Players invited bases on qualifying criteria were:
The four semi-finalists of the Women's World Chess Championship 2012:
 Anna Ushenina
 Antoaneta Stefanova
 Ju Wenjun
 Dronavalli Harika
The six highest ranked players (average of nine FIDE World Rankings lists from March 2012 to January 2013):
 Judit Polgár (declined)
 Hou Yifan
 Koneru Humpy
 Anna Muzychuk
 Zhao Xue
 Nana Dzagnidze
 Kateryna Lahno
Six organizer nominees:
 Alexandra Kosteniuk (of Geneva)
 Elina Danielian (of Dilijan)
 Nafisa Muminova (of Tashkent)
 Olga Girya (of Khanty-Mansiysk)
 Bela Khotenashvili (of Tbilisi)
 Batchimeg Tuvshintugs (of Erdenet)
Two FIDE president nominees:
 Nadezhda Kosintseva (withdrew)
 Viktorija Čmilytė
Replacements:
 Tatiana Kosintseva

Prize money and Grand Prix points
The prize money has been increased from €40,000 to €60,000 per single Grand Prix and from €60,000 to €90,000 for the overall Grand Prix finishes.

Tie breaks
With the objective of determining a clear, single winner to play in the Challenger Match and in the case that two or more players have equal cumulative points at the top, the following criteria (in descending order) will be utilized to decide the overall winner:
 Fourth result not already taken in the top three results.
 Number of actual game result points scored in the four tournaments.
 Number of first places (in case of a tie – points given accordingly).
 Number of second places (in case of a tie – points given accordingly).
 Number of wins.
 Drawing of lots.

Schedule
The fifth stage was moved from Tbilisi to Lopota. The sixth stage was moved from Erdenet, Mongolia to Sharjah, UAE, the world's largest chess club. A move apparently due to illness in the Mongolian organising committee.

The six tournaments were:

Events crosstables

Geneva 2013
{| class="wikitable" style="text-align:center;"
|+ 1st stage, Geneva, Switzerland, 2–16 May 2013
! !! Player !! Rating !! 1 !! 2 !! 3 !! 4 !! 5 !! 6 !! 7 !! 8 !! 9 !! 10 !! 11 !! 12 !! Pts !! H2H !! Wins !! SB !! TPR !! GP !! Rating change 
|- 
| 1 || align=left |  || 2505
| X || ½ || 0 || 1 || 1 || ½ || 1 || 0 || 1 || 1 || 1 || 1 || 8.0 || 0 || 7 || 39.75 || 2681 || 160 ||+26
|-
| 2 || align=left |  || 2585
| ½ || X || 1 || ½ || ½ || ½ || ½ || 1 || ½ || ½ || 1 || 1 || 7.5 || 0 || 4 || 37.75 || 2636 || 130 ||+8
|-
| 3 || align=left |  || 2517
| 1 || 0 || X || ½ || 0 || ½ || 1 || ½ || ½ || 1 || ½ || 1 || 6.5 || 0.5 || 4 || 33.00 || 2573 || 100 ||+9
|-
| 4 || align=left |  || 2545
| 0 || ½ || ½ || X || 1 || ½ || 0 || 1 || ½ || ½ || 1 || 1 || 6.5 || 0.5 || 4 || 31.25 || 2571 || 100 ||+5
|-
| 5 || align=left |  || 2544
| 0 || ½ || 1 || 0 || X || 1 || ½ || ½ || 0 || ½ || 1 || 1 || 6.0 || 1 || 4 || 29.25 || 2540 || 75 ||+0
|- 
| 6 || align=left |  || 2491
| ½ || ½ || ½ || ½ || 0 || X || ½ || 1 || 1 || ½ || ½ || ½ || 6.0 || 0 || 2 || 32.00 || 2543 || 75 ||+8 
|-
| 7 || align=left |  || 2548
| 0 || ½ || 0 || 1 || ½ || ½ || X || 0 || 1 || ½ || ½ || 1 || 5.5 || 0 || 3 || 27.25 || 2508 || 60 ||−6 
|-
| 8 || align=left |  || 2617
| 1 || 0 || ½ || 0 || ½ || 0 || 1 || X || ½ || 1 || 0 || ½ || 5.0 || 0.5 || 3 || 27.75 || 2470 || 45 ||−22
|- 
| 9 || align=left |  || 2491
| 0 || ½ || ½ || ½ || 1 || 0 || 0 || ½ || X || ½ || 1 || ½ || 5.0 || 0.5 || 2 || 25.50 || 2481 || 45 ||−2 
|- 
| 10 || align=left |  || 2522
| 0 || ½ || 0 || ½ || ½ || ½ || ½ || 0 || ½ || X || ½ || 1 || 4.5 || 0 || 1 || 22.00 || 2446 || 30 ||−12 
|-
| 11 || align=left |  || 2298
| 0 || 0 || ½ || 0 || 0 || ½ || ½ || 1 || 0 || ½ || X || ½ || 3.5 || 0 || 1 || 17.25 || 2397 || 20 ||+18 
|-
| 12 || align=left |  || 2463
| 0 || 0 || 0 || 0 || 0 || ½ || 0 || ½ || ½ || 0 || ½ || X || 2.0 || 0 || 0 || 9.75 || 2254 || 10 ||−27
|}
Bela Khotenashvili won the first Grand Prix in Geneva and also won her third Grandmaster norm.

Dilijan 2013
{| class="wikitable" style="text-align:center;"
|+ 2nd stage, Dilijan, Armenia, 15–29 June 2013
! !! Player !! Rating !! 1 !! 2 !! 3 !! 4 !! 5 !! 6 !! 7 !! 8 !! 9 !! 10 !! 11 !! 12 !! Pts !! H2H !! Wins !! SB !! TPR !! GP
|- 
| 1 || align=left |  || 2597
| X || 1 || ½ || 1 || ½ || 1 || 1 || ½ || ½ || ½ || 1 || ½ || 8.0 || 0 || 5 || 42.75 || 2667 || 160
|-
| 2 || align=left |  || 2593
| 0 || X || 1 || 1 || ½ || ½ || 1 || ½ || ½ || ½ || 1 || ½ || 7.0 || 1 || 4 || 36.75 || 2594 || 120
|-
| 3 || align=left |  || 2550
| 0 || ½ || X || 0 || ½ || ½ || 1 || 1 || 1 || 1 || ½ || 1 || 7.0 || 0 || 5 || 34.50 || 2598 || 120
|-
| 4 || align=left |  || 2526
| 0 || 0 || 1 || X || 0 || 0 || 1 || 1 || ½ || 1 || ½ || 1 || 6.0 || 0 || 5 || 30.00 || 2534 || 90
|-
| 5 || align=left |  || 2499
| ½ || ½ || ½ || 1 || X || ½ || ½ || ½ || ½ || ½ || 0 || ½ || 5.5 || 0 || 1 || 31.00 || 2505 || 80
|- 
| 6 || align=left |  || 2531
| 0 || 0 || ½ || 1 || ½ || X || ½ || ½ || 1 || 0 || ½ || ½ || 5.0 || 1 || 2 || 26.00 || 2471 || 60
|-
| 7 || align=left |  || 2316
| 0 || ½ || 0 || 0 || ½ || ½ || X || ½ || 1 || 1 || ½ || ½ || 5.0 || 1 || 2 || 24.50 || 2490 || 60
|-
| 8 || align=left |  || 2492
| ½ || ½ || 0 || 0 || ½ || ½ || ½ || X || ½ || ½ || 1 || ½ || 5.0 || 1 || 1 || 26.25 || 2474 || 60
|- 
| 9 || align=left |  || 2436
| ½ || ½ || 0 || ½ || ½ || 0 || 0 || ½ || X || ½ || 1 || ½ || 4.5 || 1.5 || 1 || 24.50 || 2447 || 30
|- 
| 10 || align=left |  || 2511
| ½ || 0 || 0 || 0 || 1 || 1 || 0 || ½ || ½ || X || ½ || ½ || 4.5 || 1 || 2 || 23.50 || 2440 || 30
|-
| 11 || align=left |  || 2475
| 0 || ½ || ½ || ½ || ½ || ½ || ½ || 0 || 0 || ½ || X || 1 || 4.5 || 0.5 || 1 || 24.00 || 2444 || 30
|-
| 12 || align=left |  || 2531
| ½ || ½ || 0 || 0 || ½ || ½ || ½ || ½ || ½ || ½ || 0 || X || 4.0 || 0 || 0 || 22.25 || 2405 || 10
|}

Tashkent 2013
{| class="wikitable" style="text-align:center;"
|+ 3rd stage, Tashkent, Uzbekistan, 17 September - 1 October 2013
! !! Player !! Rating !! 1 !! 2 !! 3 !! 4 !! 5 !! 6 !! 7 !! 8 !! 9 !! 10 !! 11 !! 12 !! Pts !! SB !! TPR !! GP
|- 
| 1 || align=left |  || 2607
| X || 0 || ½ || ½ || 1 || 1 || 1 || ½  || 1 || ½  || 1 || 1 || 8.0 ||39.25 || 2637 || 160
|-
| 2 || align=left |  || 2514
| 1 || X || ½ || 0 || 1 || 0 || 0 || 1 || ½ || 1 || 1 || 1 || 7.0 || 35.00 || 2572 || 120
|-
| 3 || align=left |  || 2532
| ½ || ½ || X || ½ || 0 || ½ || 1 || ½ || 1 || 1 || ½ || 1 || 7.0 || 34.50 || 2571 || 120
|-
| 4 || align=left |  || 2475
| ½ || 1 || ½ || X || 0 || ½ || 0 || 1 || 1 || ½ || 1 || ½ || 6.5 || 34.00 || 2543 || 85
|-
| 5 || align=left |  || 2533
| 0 || 0 || 1 || 1 || X || 0 || 1 || 1 || 0 || 1 || 1 || ½ || 6.5 || 32.75 || 2533 || 85
|- 
| 6 || align=left |  || 2535
| 0 || 1 || ½ || ½ || 1 || X || ½ || ½ || ½ || 1 || 0 || ½ || 6.0 || 33.50 || 2505 || 70
|-
| 7 || align=left |  || 2495
| 0 || 1 || 0 || 1 || 0 || ½ || X || 0 || ½ || ½ || 1 || 1 || 5.5 ||25.75 || 2477 || 55
|-
| 8 || align=left |  || 2439
| ½ || 0 || ½ || 0 || 0 || ½ || 1 || X || ½ || ½ || 1 || 1 || 5.5 || 25.25 || 2482 || 55
|- 
| 9 || align=left |  || 2470
| 0 || ½ || 0 || 0 || 1 || ½ || ½ || ½ || X || ½ || ½ || 1 || 5.0 ||23.75 || 2448 || 40
|- 
| 10 || align=left |  || 2496
| ½ || 0 || 0 || ½ || 0 || 0 || ½ || ½ || ½ || X || 1 || 1 || 4.5 || 19.75 || 2413 || 30
|-
| 11 || align=left |  || 2293
| 0 || 0 || ½ || 0 || 0 || 1 || 0 || 0 || ½ || 0 || X || 1 || 3.0 || 13.50 || 2325 || 20
|-
| 12 || align=left |  || 2307
| 0 || 0 || 0 || ½ || ½ || ½ || 0 || 0 || 0 || 0 || 0 || X || 1.5 || 9.50 || 2173 || 10
|}

Khanty-Mansiyk 2014
{| class="wikitable" style="text-align:center;"
|+ 4th stage, Khanty-Mansiysk, Russia, 8–22 April 2014
! !! Player !! Rating !! 1 !! 2 !! 3 !! 4 !! 5 !! 6 !! 7 !! 8 !! 9 !! 10 !! 11 !! 12 !! Pts !! SB !! TPR !! GP
|- 
| 1 || align=left |  || 2618
| X || 1 || ½ || ½ || ½ || 1 || ½ || ½  || 1 || 1  || 1 || 1 || 8.5 ||43.00 || 2695 || 160
|-
| 2 ||  align=left |  || 2450
| 0 || X || 1 || 0 || 1 || 1 || ½ || 1 || ½ || ½ || 1 || ½ || 7.0 || 35.50 || 2602 || 130
|-
| 3 || align=left |  || 2527
| ½ || 0 || X || ½ || 1 || 1 || ½ || ½ || ½ || 1 || 0 || 1 || 6.5 || 34.00 || 2558 || 110
|-
| 4 || align=left |  || 2543
| ½ || 1 || ½ || X || ½ || ½ || ½ || 0 || 1 || ½ || ½ || ½ || 6.0 || 33.50 || 2527 || 85
|-
| 5 || align=left |  || 2560
| ½ || 0 || 0 || ½ || X || ½ || ½ || 1 || ½ || 1 || ½ || 1 || 6.0 || 29.50 || 2526 || 85
|- 
| 6 || align=left |  || 2550
| 0 || 0 || 0 || ½ || ½ || X || 1 || 0 || ½ || 1 || 1 || 1 || 5.5 || 25.00 || 2491 || 65
|-
| 7 || align=left |  || 2489
| ½ || ½ || ½ || ½ || ½ || 0 || X || 0 || 1 || 1 || ½ || ½ || 5.5 ||29.50 || 2496 || 65
|-
| 8 || align=left |  || 2552
| ½ || 0 || ½ || 1 || 0 || 1 || 1 || X || ½ || 0 || ½ || 0 || 5.0 || 28.75 || 2454 || 45
|- 
| 9 || align=left |  || 2501
| 0 || ½ || ½ || 0 || ½ || ½ || 0 || ½ || X || 1 || 1 || ½ || 5.0 ||24.25 || 2459 || 40
|- 
| 10 || align=left |  || 2321
| 0 || 0 || 1 || ½ || ½ || 0 || ½ || ½ || 0 || X || 1 || 1 || 4.0 || 18.50 || 2409 || 30
|-
| 11 || align=left |  || 2496
| 0 || 0 || 1 || ½ || ½ || 0 || ½ || ½ || 0 || 0 || X || ½ || 3.5 || 19.50 || 2363 || 15
|-
| 12 || align=left |  || 2340
| 0 || ½ || 0 || ½ || 0 || 0 || ½ || 1 || ½ || 0 || ½ || X || 3.5 || 18.50 || 2377 || 15
|}

Olga Girya achieved a GM norm at the tournament.

Lopota 2014
{| class="wikitable" style="text-align:center;"
|+ 5th stage, Lopota, Georgia, 19 June - July 1, 2014
! !! Player !! Rating !! 1 !! 2 !! 3 !! 4 !! 5 !! 6 !! 7 !! 8 !! 9 !! 10 !! 11 !! 12 !! Pts !! Direct Encounter|H2H !! Victories !!    SB !!TPR !! GP
|- 
| 1 || align=left |  || 2629
| X ||1 ||½ ||1 ||1 ||½ ||1 ||½ || ½|| 1|| 1|| 1|| 9.0 || 0 ||7  ||45.00 ||2773 ||160
|-
| 2 ||  align=left|  || 2532
| 0 || X ||1||½ ||1||½||1||½ ||1||½|||0|||1|| 7.0 || 1|| 5  || 34.75 ||2622 ||120
|-
| 3 || align=left|  || 2460
|  ½ ||0|| X ||½||½||½||1||1||0||1||½||1|| 7.0|| 0 ||  4 || 34.00  || 2628 ||120
|-
| 4 || align=left |  ||2541
|  0 ||½||½|| X ||0||½||½||1||½||1||1||1|| 6.5||0  ||4  ||29.00  ||2584  ||90
|-
| 5 || align=left |  || 2488
|0   ||0||½||1|| X ||½||½||0||1||1||½||1|| 6.0||0.5  ||4   ||27.75  ||2560  ||75
|- 
| 6 || align=left |  || 2503
|½   || ½ || ½ || ½ || ½ || X || ½ || 0 || 1 || ½ || ½ || 1 || 6.0||0.5  ||2  ||30.75  ||2558  ||75   
|-
| 7 || align=left |  || 2561
| 0  || 0 || 0 || ½ || ½ || ½ || X ||½  || 1 || ½ || 1  || 1 || 5.5||1.5  ||3  ||23.75  ||2517  ||50
|-
| 8 || align=left |  ||2613
|½   || ½ || 0 || 0 || 1 || 1 || ½ || X || ½ || ½ || 0 || 1 || 5.5||1.0  ||3  ||28.75  ||2512  ||50
|- 
| 9 || align=left |  || 2532
| ½   || 1 || ½  || ½  || 0 || 0 || 0 || ½  || X || ½  || 1 || 1 || 5.5||0.5  ||3  ||27.25  ||2520  ||50
|- 
| 10|| align=left |  || 2538
| 0  || 0 || 0 ||  0|| 0 ||½  ||½  || ½ || ½ || X ||½  || 1 || 3.5||0  ||1  ||14.25  ||2386  ||30
|-
| 11|| align=left |  || 2518
| 0  || ½ || 0 || 0 || 0 || 0 || 0 || 1 || 0 ||1  || X || ½ || 3.0||0  ||1  ||16.75  ||2346  ||20
|-
| 12|| align=left |  || 2332
|  0 || ½ || 0 ||0  || 0 || 0 || 0 ||0  ||0  || 0 ||1  || X || 1.5||0  ||1  ||6.50  ||2229  ||10
|}

Ju Wenjun achieved another GM norm which makes it her final GM norm.

Sharjah 2014
{| class="wikitable" style="text-align:center;"
|+ 6th stage, Sharjah, United Arab Emirates, 24 August – 7 September 2014
! !! Player !! Rating !! 1 !! 2 !! 3 !! 4 !! 5 !! 6 !! 7 !! 8 !! 9 !! 10 !! 11 !! 12 !! Pts !! Rating change !!TPR !! GP
|- 
| 1 || align=left |  || 2559
| X ||½ ||½ || 1 ||½ ||1 ||½ ||1 || ½|| 1 || 1|| 1|| 8.5 || +19 ||2696 ||145
|-
| 2 ||  align=left|  || 2661
| ½ || X ||½||½ ||1||½||1||½ ||1||1|||1|||1|| 8.5 || +4 ||2687||145
|-
| 3 || align=left|  || 2521
| 0 || ½ || X ||½||½||1||½||1||0||½||1||1|| 6.5|| +5 || 2551 ||87.5
|-
| 4 || align=left |  ||2508
| 0 || ½ ||½|| X ||½||½||1||0||½||1||1||1|| 6.5|| +7 || 2552 ||87.5
|-
| 5 || align=left | || 2487
| ½ ||0||½||½|| X ||½||½||1||1||½||½||1|| 6.5|| +11 || 2554 ||87.5
|- 
| 6 || align=left |  || 2346
| ½ || ½ || 0 || ½ || ½ || X || 1 || ½ || ½ || 1 || ½ || 1 || 6.5|| +64|| 2567 ||87.5
|-
| 7 || align=left |  ||2598
| ½ || 0 || ½ || ½ || ½ || 0 || X ||1  || 1 || ½ || ½  || 1 || 5.5|| -17 || 2481||60
|-
| 8 || align=left |  || 2490
| 0 || ½ || 0 || 1 || 0 || ½ || 0 || X || ½ || 1 || 1 || ½ || 5|| -5 || 2459||50
|- 
| 9 || align=left |  || 2494
| ½ || 0 || ½  || 1  || ½ || 0 || ½ || ½  || X || 0  || ½ || 1 || 4.5|| -10 || 2427 ||40
|- 
| 10|| align=left |  || 2461
| 0 || 0 || ½ || 0|| ½ ||0 ||½  || 0 || 1 || X ||½  || ½ || 3.5|| -15 || 2361 ||30
|-
| 11|| align=left |  || 2315
| 0  || 0 || ½ || 0 || ½ || ½ || ½ || 0 || ½ ||½  || X || ½ || 3.0|| +2 || 2336 ||20
|-
| 12|| align=left |  || 2446
|  0 || 0 || 0 ||0  || 0 || 0 || 0 ||½  ||0  || ½ ||½  || X || 1.5|| -33  || 2174 ||10
|}

Batchimeg Tuvshintugs achieved a 9-game GM norm, her first one.

Grand Prix standings
The lowest of four results is in italics and not taken into the total result. Khotenashvili took the lead after stage one, then Koneru Humpy went into the lead by winning two stages in a row. Hou Yifan then overtook the lead of Koneru Humpy at the last stage.

The top two places are the same as in the two previous Grand Prix cycles.

Notes
Nadezhda Kosintseva withdrew from the Women's Grand Prix and she has been replaced by the next highest rating reserve, Tatiana Kosintseva.
 Viktorija Cmilyte withdrew her participation in Tashkent due to illness and was replaced by Guliskhan Nakhbayeva.
 Antoaneta Stefanova replaced Elina Danielian in Khanty-Mansiysk.
 Alexandra Kosteniuk and Kateryna Lahno swapped places at fifth and sixth stage.
 Viktorija Cmilyte and Kateryna Lahno were replaced by Alina L'Ami and Zhu Chen at the sixth stage.

See also
 FIDE Women's Grand Prix 2011–12, the previous cycle
 FIDE Women's Grand Prix 2015–16, the next cycle

References

External links
FIDE Grand Prix: Official site
FIDE Women's Grand Prix 2013–2014: Regulations
Fondation Neva Women Grand Prix - Geneva, Switzerland 2013: Final Ranking

Women's chess competitions
2013 in chess
2014 in chess
FIDE Grand Prix